Forges-la-Forêt is a commune in the Ille-et-Vilaine department  of Brittany in north-western France.

Population
Inhabitants of Forges-la-Forêt are called Fèvres in French.

See also
Communes of the Ille-et-Vilaine department

References

External links

Mayors of Ille-et-Vilaine Association  

Communes of Ille-et-Vilaine